The 2010 International Rules Series (officially the 2010 Irish Daily Mail International Rules Series) was the 15th International Rules Series, contested between Gaelic football players from Ireland and Australian rules football players from Australia. The Series was won by Australia, winning the first test by seven points and the second test by three, thereby winning with an aggregate score of 102 to 92. This was the first time Australia have won the Cormac McAnallen Cup since 2006. Dane Swan was awarded the Jim Stynes Medal, for being Australia best player over the Series, while Colm Begley won the equivalent award for Ireland. The second test in Croke Park on 30 October marked the end of the broadcasting career of commentator Micheál Ó Muircheartaigh who commentated on his last live match on RTÉ Radio.

Background
The 2010 International rules series dates were confirmed by the Australian Football League (AFL) and the Gaelic Athletic Association (GAA) on 19 February. Australian coach Mick Malthouse announced his 23-man squad on 8 October. Anthony Tohill was announced as coach of Ireland mid year, and he announced his squad on 14 October. The 2010 Series was the first series to be played since 2008, after global economic problems forced the AFL to pull out of the 2009 edition. It also marked the first series in Ireland since the ill-fated 2006 series. Irish Team Manager Anthony Tohill announced his final squad for the first test of the series on 19 October. Niall McNamee of Offaly is promoted from the standby list to the match day squad for the injured Benny Coulter, who is ruled out of the first test with a hamstring problem. Emmet Bolton of Kildare replaced Michael Shields who was unavailable for the first test as he was playing for St.Finbarr's in the 2010 Cork Senior Football Championship final against Nemo Rangers on 20 October.

Australia prepared for the opening test with a comfortable win in a practice match against a Cork underage representative side on 20 October. Australia won the match 105–12, in front of 2,867 fans at Páirc Uí Rinn in Cork on the Wednesday night, prior to the opening test in Limerick.

Squads

*Reserved on Standby

Matches

See also
 International rules football
 Gaelic football
 Australian rules football
 Comparison of Australian rules football and Gaelic football

References

External links 

International Rules Series
International Rules Series
International Rules series
International sports competitions hosted by Ireland
October 2010 sports events in Europe